Qutb-ul Aqtaab Naqib Al Ashraaf Syed Abd ar-Rahman al-Qadri al-Gillani (11 January 1841 – 13 June 1927) was the first prime minister of Iraq, and its head of state. He was an important figure during the Ottoman and the British Eras, and he had an important role in the politics of Iraq.

Early life 
Al-Gillani was born in Baghdad to a Sufi family. Al-Gillani was the 15th descendant of Abdul Qadir al-Gillani. His family has been known since ancient times for its scientific significance and councilmen and was known for his morality and love for his people. He was the captain of the Banu Hashim of the Quraishi tribe in Baghdad. He lived most of his life as an Ottoman and studied under Sultan Abdul Hamid II who strongly supported him on the issue of Palestine when he was young.

Political career 
Al-Gillani was chosen in 1920 to head the Iraqi Council of Ministers following the dissolution of the Ottoman Empire. Due to his good relations with the British and his personality, he was one of the candidates for the throne of Iraq. He refused to take the title out of renunciation of the King but agreed to be Prime Minister. He used his influence to oppose the appointment of Faisal I as King of Iraq and resigned from his post when his efforts were defeated. Nevertheless, Faisal still reappointed him as prime minister in order to curb opposition.

In 1922, al-Gillani negotiated the first Anglo-Iraqi Treaty, which ensured nominal independence for the country, though Britain maintained control of the military and foreign affairs, essentially establishing a Mandate in the country. Opposed to these results, al-Gillani resigned shortly after and spent the rest of his life in seclusion.

Death and Burial 
Al-Gillani died on 13 June 1927 in Baghdad, aged 86. His funeral was attended by many high figures of Iraq including Prince Ghazi. He was buried inside the Mausoleum of Abdul-Qadir Gillani shrine near the shrine of Abdul Qadir al-Gillani.

In pop culture 
Al-Gillani and his role in the Ottoman Empire was briefly mentioned in the Iraqi television drama Sarah Khatoon, which aired on Al Sharqiya.

See also 

 List of prime ministers of Iraq

References

1841 births
1927 deaths
Arabs from the Ottoman Empire
Prime Ministers of Iraq
Hashemite people
Iraqi Muslims